James Henry Monk (12 December 1784 – 6 June 1856) was an English divine and classical scholar.

Life

He was born at Buntingford, Hertfordshire. He was educated at Norwich School, Charterhouse School and Trinity College, Cambridge, and in 1809 was elected Regius Professor of Greek in succession to Porson. The establishment of the classical tripos was in great measure due to his efforts. In 1822 he was appointed Dean of Peterborough; in 1830, bishop of Gloucester (with which the see of Bristol was amalgamated in 1836). He took his seat in the House of Lords in July 1831.

Works

He is best known as the author of a Life of Bentley (1830) and as the editor (with CJ Blomfield) of Porson's Adversaria (1812).

References

External links

1784 births
1856 deaths
People educated at Charterhouse School
People from Buntingford
Alumni of Trinity College, Cambridge
English classical scholars
Bishops of Gloucester
Bishops of Gloucester and Bristol
Deans of Peterborough
19th-century Church of England bishops
Canons of Westminster
People educated at Norwich School
Regius Professors of Greek (Cambridge)
English male writers

18th-century Anglican theologians
19th-century Anglican theologians